Vaughn Joseph Taylor (born March 9, 1976) is an American professional golfer who has played on the PGA Tour and Web.com Tour.

Born in Roanoke, Virginia, Taylor was raised in Augusta, Georgia, from infancy. After attending Hephzibah High School, he played golf for Augusta State University where he was an honorable mention All-American his senior season. He continues to reside in the Augusta area with his wife, Leot.

Taylor turned professional in 1999. He played his early years on the Hooters and Nationwide Tours, getting valuable experience before playing his first full year with a PGA Tour card in 2004. He won four times on the NGA Hooters Tour, and once on the Nationwide Tour at the Knoxville Open. Taylor has three victories to his name on the PGA Tour; his first two victories coming in consecutive years at the Reno-Tahoe Open, an alternate event, in 2004 and 2005. His victory in 2004 was one of five wins by rookies that year and came after holing an 11-foot birdie on the first extra hole during a four-man sudden-death playoff. He had also previously had to sink a 14-foot birdie putt on the final hole of regulation play to make it into the playoff. In 2005, he led the event wire-to-wire and held a six-stroke advantage entering the final round, to claim a comfortable victory by three strokes from Jonathan Kaye.

After a year that included a career high six top-10s, Taylor qualified to play on the U.S. Ryder Cup team for the first time in 2006. He earned a half point for his team with a record of 0–1–1.

Taylor's highest world ranking was 37th in 2007 and career high in the FedEx Cup placing was 35th in 2010.

Taylor started the 2015–16 season playing on both the PGA Tour and Web.com Tour, having only past champion status on the PGA Tour after finishing 151st in the FedEx Cup, just a fraction of a point from conditional status. He made two starts on the PGA Tour before making two starts on the Web.com Tour, where he missed the cut in Panama and withdrew due to illness in Colombia. In February 2016, Taylor won the AT&T Pebble Beach Pro-Am, his first PGA Tour win since August 2005. He started the week as first alternate, only earning entry after Carl Pettersson withdrew, and had not been fully exempt since 2012. The win was also Taylor's first at a non-alternate event and moved him from 447th in the world to 100th.

Professional wins (8)

PGA Tour wins (3)

PGA Tour playoff record (1–2)

Nationwide Tour wins (1)

Nationwide Tour playoff record (1–0)

Other wins (4)
4 wins on the NGA Hooters Tour

Results in major championships

CUT = missed the half way cut
"T" indicates a tie for a place.

Summary

Most consecutive cuts made – 1 (four times, current)
Longest streak of top-10s – 1

Results in The Players Championship

CUT = missed the halfway cut
"T" indicates a tie for a place
C = Canceled after the first round due to the COVID-19 pandemic

Results in World Golf Championships
Results not in chronological order prior to 2015.

"T" = tied
Note that the HSBC Champions did not become a WGC event until 2009.

U.S. national team appearances
Ryder Cup: 2006

See also
2003 Nationwide Tour graduates
2011 PGA Tour Qualifying School graduates

References

External links

American male golfers
PGA Tour golfers
Ryder Cup competitors for the United States
Korn Ferry Tour graduates
Golfers from Virginia
Golfers from Augusta, Georgia
Augusta Jaguars men's golfers
Sportspeople from Roanoke, Virginia
People from Hephzibah, Georgia
1976 births
Living people